The 2006 New Zealand bravery awards were announced via a special honours list on 14 October 2006, and recognised 15 people for acts of bravery between 2000 and 2005.

New Zealand Bravery Decoration (NZBD)
 Craig David Bennett – constable, New Zealand Police.

 Ngakina Jane Bertrand – sergeant, New Zealand Police.

 Pes Sia'atoutai Fa'aui – of Glen Eden.

 David Templeton – sergeant, New Zealand Police.

 George William White – sergeant, New Zealand Police.

New Zealand Bravery Medal (NZBM)
 Philip Samuel Blakeman – sergeant, Royal New Zealand Air Force.

 Kerry Charles Palmer
 Shaun Bruce Campbell
 Hugo Johannes Josephus Verhagen

 Able Hydrographic Systems Operator Keran Mana Durrant – lately Royal New Zealand Navy.
 Able Chef Tyson Wiremu Job – Royal New Zealand Navy.

 Kali Peaua Fungavaka 

 Staff Sergeant Dion Wayne Palmer – Royal New Zealand Army Education Corps.

 Squadron Leader Shaun Paul Sexton – Royal New Zealand Air Force.

 Joan Diane Taylor – of Nelson.

References

Bravery
Bravery awards
New Zealand bravery awards